Willett Hot Springs is located in the Sespe Wilderness, North of Ojai, California. This natural hot spring has been augmented by a man made collection basin. The most popular approach to the hot spring is by an approximate  hike from the Piedra Blanca trailhead in Los Padres National Forest. Nearby Sespe Hot Springs (about ) has a reputation as one of the hottest springs in California.

External links
 USDA: Los Padres National Forest Hot Springs

References

Hot springs of California
Los Padres National Forest
Bodies of water of Ventura County, California